Syringodium filiforme, commonly known as manatee grass, is a species of marine seagrass. It forms meadows in shallow sandy or muddy locations in the Caribbean Sea and the Gulf of Mexico, and is also found in the Bahamas and Bermuda.

Climate Change Influences
Manatee seagrasses are a flowering plant that thrives in shallow saltwater around the coast of Florida. Worldwide Manatee seagrass is experiencing global decline due to ever changing events in their environment. These descendants of terrestrial plants that were able to survive over 65 million years of evolution are now facing being wiped from the planet due to climate change and other anthropogenic factors. This is the first time in history that there is a probability of losing seagrass species worldwide. Currently under the IUCN these plants are red listed as a threatened species (Short, Frederick T. et al., 2011). 
As of 2010 there were 10 seagrass species at high rick of extinction. While three were considered endangered. With seagrass species loss comes biodiversity loss. This paper studies not only human impact on seagrass beds but also global climate change and how changing environments are impacting seagrasses worldwide (Short, Frederick T. et al., 2011). Understanding the importance of manatee grass will help direct towards saving them from global climate change. Seagrass meadows provide many ecological importance's and rank one of the highest ecosystems on the earth. The roots and rhizomes of seagrasses stabilise sediments and prevent erosion to the land. Their leaves filter suspended nutrients from the water column. This in turn links them to coral reefs, mangroves, salt marshes, and even oyster reefs (Bjork, Mats, et al.). 
	Seagrasses are distributed through six main global bioregions; Temperate North Atlantic, Tropical Atlantic, Mediterranean, Temperate North Pacific, Tropical Indo-Pacific andTemperate Southern Oceans.  Throughout all regions they are used as medicine, food, and their main source of contribution to humans is their sediment trapping and binding capacities. The leaves act as a trap and collect materials brought to the seagrass meadows. In turn this helps keep the ecosystem clear and clean of any material (Bjork, Mats, et al.). 
	Unfortunately, much like other environments in the world, human development can alter the ecology of the sea grasses and therefore the coast of Florida is starting to look high densities of this type of ecosystem. Natural disturbances are also playing a major role in habitat loss. C02 has increased from 280ppt in 1880 to 380 in 2005. The most common consequence of increasing C02 levels on seagrasses is its increase on photosynthesis and growth. This increase of photosynthesis increases the level of HCO3- which lowers the pH of the water (Bjork, Mats, et al.). 
	A study done by Heck, KL, et al., recorded levels throughout most temperate and polar environments. A well-studied effect from this was that of climate causing a shift in tropical aquatic species. Aquatic species in the Northern Gold of Mexico are currently migrating there due to climate and finding food source, that many native animals are being out competed for their own food. Thus manatee grasses are being over grazed and resulting in lower nursery areas for native species that rely on the meadows. 
	As of 2011, Florida had a management plan to develop sage channels for seagrass restoration along certain docks, marinas and channels. As climate change effects the shifts of certain animals, such as the manatee, legal framework is put into action. Although this may increase manatee sea growth in certain areas. This issue at hands becomes whether or not these seagrasses will continue to grow in native areas to protect the coast of Florida from erosion, keep manatees alive, and out of all making sure this ecosystem doesn't fail.

Physical Oceanography and manatee grass 
      Manatee seagrasses receive considerable  amount of effects from the ocean. These effects range from salinity, temperature, sun, and climate. In 2004, the Loxahatchee River estuary was effected by two hurricanes (Frances and Jeanne) causing considerable amount of damage to these sea grass beds. These hurricane devastations were monitored for 12-15 months with little recovery of the grass beds.  The most likely cause was from the salinity amount that the hurricanes brought in to this estuary (Ridler, Mary S., et al.)
       The Loxahatchee River  estuary encompasses 400 ha and drains 700 km2 from the Palm Beach County watershed. The watershed has been influenced by a hydrology system that controls flood effects to human populations. Hurricanes Frances and Jeanne affected the Loxahatchee River watershed in September 2004 with high winds, heavy rainfall, and excessive freshwater runoff. Hurricanes Frances and Jeanne produced 610 mm of rainfall and resulted in excessive freshwater influx to the estuary. This caused a negative affected of salinity, light availability, and water quality in the Loxahatchee River Estuary. Freshwater discharges resulting from the hurricanes severely damaged manatee seagrass beds, nearly wiping out the entire colony in the estuary.(Ridler, Mary S., et al.) 
       The occurrence, density, and biomass of S.filiforme declined intensley following the September 2004 hurricanes. Variability in species and coverage extent of seagrass communities in the Loxahatchee River Estuary has been observed and documented by local agencies since the 1980s.The present study shows the effect of the September2004 hurricanes on S. filiforme based upon 15 mo of pre-hurricane and 12 mo of post-hurricane data. The hurricanes of 2004 resulted in hurricane force winds and extreme influx of freshwater which appears to have affected S. filiforme. Seagrass occurrence and density was reduced immediately following the hurricanes (Ridler, Mary S., et al.) 
       As known, hurricanes can have huge impacts around the globe. Today it is extremely important to continuously monitor post hurricane effects, especially on grass beds that are vastly important in keeping endangered animals such as the manatee alive. Seagrass beds also play an ecological role such as nurseries for many animals. Further studies and monitoring should be done to contribute to the growth and well being of these area of study along with other contributors to the water system of Loxahatchee River Estuary.

References

Ridler, Mary S., et al. “Effects of Two Hurricanes Onsyringodium Filiforme, Manatee Grass, within the Loxahatchee River Estuary, Southeast Florida.” Estuaries and Coasts, vol. 29, no. 6, 2006, pp. 1019–1025., https://doi.org/10.1007/bf02798664. 

ork, Mats, et al. “Managing Seagrasses for Resilience to Climate Change .” IUCN Resilience Science Group Working Paper Series, vol. 03, pp. 1–61.

External links
 

Heck, KL, et al. “Seagrass Consumption by Native and a Tropically Associated Fish Species: Potential Impacts of the Tropicalization of the Northern Gulf of Mexico.” Marine Ecology Progress Series, vol. 520, 2015, pp. 165–173., https://doi.org/10.3354/meps11104.

Hotaling, Althea, et al. “Comprehensive Seagrass Restoration Planning in Southwest Florida: Science, Law and Management.” SSRN Electronic Journal, 2011, https://doi.org/10.2139/ssrn.2675711.

Ray, Brandon R., et al. “Changes in Seagrass Species Composition in Northwestern Gulf of Mexico Estuaries: Effects on Associated Seagrass Fauna.” PLoS ONE, vol. 9, no. 9, 2014, https://doi.org/10.1371/journal.pone.0107751.

Short, Frederick T., et al. “Extinction Risk Assessment of the World's Seagrass Species.” Biological Conservation, vol. 144, no. 7, 2011, pp. 1961–1971., https://doi.org/10.1016/j.biocon.2011.04.010.

Cymodoceaceae
Biota of the Atlantic Ocean
Taxa named by Friedrich Traugott Kützing